The 1967 Nobel Peace Prize was not awarded because the Norwegian Nobel Committee decided that none of the nominations met the criteria in Nobel's will. Instead, the prize money was allocated with 1/3 to the Main Fund and with 2/3 to the Special Fund of this prize section.

Deliberations

Nominations
In total, the Norwegian Nobel Committee received 95 nominations for 37 individuals and 10 organizations such as Vinoba Bhave, Grenville Clark, Norman Cousins, Danilo Dolci, Pope Paul VI, Bertrand Russell (awarded the 1950 Nobel Prize in Literature), U Thant, the International Union for Land Value Taxation and Free Trade and the Universal Esperanto Association (UEA). The highest number of nominations – 11 recommendation letters – was for the Austrian–Japanese politician Richard von Coudenhove-Kalergi.

Twenty five of these nominees were nominated for the first time such as Abbé Pierre, Ernest Gruening, Kurt Hahn, Thích Nhất Hạnh, İsmet İnönü, Danny Kaye, Sargent Shriver, Geoffrey Leonard Cheshire, Binay Ranjan Sen, Amnesty International (awarded in 1977), the World Federation of United Nations Associations (WFUNA) and the Islands of Peace. The British philanthropist Sue Ryder was the only female nominee. Notable figures such as Félicien Challaye, Che Guevara, Woody Guthrie, Florence Jaffray Harriman, Harold Holt, Kathleen Innes, Annette Kolb, Mohammad Mosaddegh, Abraham Johannes Muste and Georges Vanier died in 1967 without having been nominated for the peace prize while the American philosopher William Ernest Hocking was nominated posthumously.

Notes

References

External links

1969